My Favorite Guitars may refer to:

 My Favorite Guitars (Chet Atkins album), 1964
 My Favorite Guitars (Andreas Oberg album), 2008